Wanted Dead or Alive is an EP by Altamont, which was released in 1997 through Man's Ruin Records.

Track listing
"Pluto Washington's Introduction"
"Sally Greensnake"
"Red Jackson"
"Casino"
"Pluto Closes Shop"

Personnel
Dale Crover - Guitar, vocals
Joey Osbourne - drums, vocals
Dan Southwick - Bass
Billy Anderson - Producer
Aaron Nudelman - Organ, Engineer
Tom Baker - Mastering

References

Altamont (band) albums
1997 EPs
Albums produced by Billy Anderson (producer)
Man's Ruin Records EPs